Acroaspis is a genus of South Pacific orb-weaver spiders first described by Ferdinand Karsch in 1878.

Species
 it contains six species in Australia and New Zealand:
Acroaspis decorosa (Urquhart, 1894) – New Zealand
Acroaspis lancearia (Keyserling, 1887) – Australia (New South Wales)
Acroaspis mamillana (Keyserling, 1887) – Australia (New South Wales)
Acroaspis olorina Karsch, 1878 – Australia (Western Australia, New South Wales)
Acroaspis scutifer (Keyserling, 1886) – Australia (New South Wales)
Acroaspis tuberculifera Thorell, 1881 – Australia (Queensland)

References

Araneidae
Araneomorphae genera
Spiders of Australia
Spiders of New Zealand
Taxa named by Ferdinand Karsch